Odontopygidae is a family of millipedes belonging to the order Spirostreptida.

Genera

Genera:
 Allantogonus Attems, 1912
 Aquattuor Frederiksen, 2013
 Archepyge Manfredi, 1939

References

Spirostreptida